H. australiana may refer to:

Hedera australiana, a synonym of Polyscias australiana
Huperzia australiana, a fir-moss
Hyadesia australiana, a mite